Jacek Franciszek Streich (born 12 October 1967 in Toruń) is a Polish rower.

References 
 
 

1967 births
Living people
Polish male rowers
Sportspeople from Toruń
Rowers at the 1988 Summer Olympics
Rowers at the 1992 Summer Olympics
Rowers at the 1996 Summer Olympics
Olympic bronze medalists for Poland
Olympic rowers of Poland
Olympic medalists in rowing
World Rowing Championships medalists for Poland
Medalists at the 1992 Summer Olympics